Willybreen is a glacier on Barentsøya, Svalbard. It is an offshoot of Barentsjøkulen, reaching down to the sea in the eastern direction. The glacier is named after German zoologist Willy Kükenthal.

References

Glaciers of Svalbard
Barentsøya